Clump or clumping may refer to:

 Clumping (biology), an organic behavior
 Wittenham Clumps, a small group of hills
 Clumped isotopes (chemistry), heavy isotopes that are bonded to other heavy isotopes
 "clump", an iamamiwhoami song
 Transit vehicle clumping, when one public transport vehicle falls behind schedule, and another scheduled behind it meets it in the same location